Anthony Crane (born March 28, 1963) is an American former pornographic actor.

Personal life
On April 19, 2002, Crane pleaded guilty to charges of being a felon in possession of a firearm and making terroristic threats against his ex-wife, Nicole London, and his ex-girlfriend, Jasmine Klein. He was sentenced to five years and four months in prison.

Awards
2000 AVN Award – Best Non-Sex Performance – Double Feature!
2002 AVN Award – Best Actor (Film) – Beast

References

External links
 
 
 

1963 births
American male pornographic film actors
Living people
Male actors from Hartford, Connecticut
Pornographic film actors from Connecticut